is a railway station on the Iwate Ginga Railway Line in the town of Iwate, Iwate Prefecture, Japan, operated by the Iwate Ginga Railway.

Lines
Iwate-Kawaguchi Station is served by the Iwate Ginga Railway Line, and is located 26.9 kilometers from the terminus of the line at Morioka Station and 562.2 kilometers from Tokyo Station.

Station layout
Iwate-Kawaguchi Station has an island platform and a single side platform connected to the station building by a footbridge. The station is staffed.

Platforms

Adjacent stations

History
It was renamed to its present name on 1 February 1934. The station was absorbed into the JR East network upon the privatization of the Japanese National Railways (JNR) on 1 April 1987 and was transferred to the Iwate Ginga Railway on 1 September 2002.

Passenger statistics
In fiscal 2015, the station was used by an average of 296 passengers daily.

Surrounding area
Kawaguchi Post Office
Kawaguchi Elementary School
Kawaguchi Middle School

References

External links

  

Railway stations in Iwate Prefecture
Iwate Galaxy Railway Line
Railway stations in Japan opened in 1898
Iwate, Iwate